A chaupai (चौपाई) is a quatrain verse of Indian poetry, especially medieval Hindi poetry, that uses a metre of four syllables.

Famous chaupais include those of poet-saint Tulsidas (used in his classical text Ramcharitamanas and poem Hanuman Chalisa) .

Chaupai is identified by a syllable count 16/16, counted with a value of 1 in case of Hrasva (short sounding letter) and 2 in case of Dirgha (long sounding letter).

Examples
Some of the famous 40 chaupais (known as "chalisa");

Hanuman Chalisa
Ganesh Chalisa
Shiv Chalisa

See also
Chhand (poetry)
Chaupai (Sikhism)

Indian poetics
Stanzaic form
Poetic rhythm